Robert Mileski or Robbie Mileski (born 16 May 1987) is an Australian footballer. He previously played for NSW Premier League clubs Sydney Olympic FC and Sydney United 58 FC.

An approach was made by the Macedonia Football Federation for the Sydney FC youth league player to join their national team set up. Representatives of the Macedonia Federation contacted a Sydney-based player advisor/manager regarding Mileski as a potential national team player.

Honours
With Sydney FC:
 National Youth League Championship: 2008-2009

With Sydney Olympic FC:
 NSW Premier League Minor Premiership: 2011

With Sydney United:
  Waratah Cup: 2016

References

External links
 Sydney FC profile

1987 births
Living people
Sydney FC players
Australian soccer players
Australian people of Macedonian descent
Bankstown City FC players
Sydney United 58 FC players
National Premier Leagues players
Association football forwards